Soltera, casada, viuda, divorciada is an upcoming Peruvian comedy film directed by Ani Alva Helfer. It stars Gianella Neyra, Katia Condos, Milene Vásquez and Patricia Portocarrero. Its premiere is scheduled for April 20, 2023 in Peruvian theaters.

Synopsis 
After the death of Cecilia's husband, she and 3 other friends get together and prepare to take a trip to Pacasmayo, but the trip turns into a crazy odyssey that puts their friendship to the test. On the way to help her friend close her grief, they must learn to unite to face the challenges in their lives and they will try to give themselves a second chance to heal wounds, overcome fears and accept themselves.

Cast 
The actors participating in this film are:

 Gianella Neyra as Cecilia
 Katia Condos as Conny
 Milene Vázquez as Lorena
 Patricia Portocarrero as Daniela
 Diego Bertie
 Rodrigo Sánchez Patiño
 Rodrigo Palacios
 Giovanni Ciccia

Production 
Soltera, casada, viuda, divorciada began filming in mid-July 2022 in northern Peru (Pacasmayo)

References 

2023 films
2023 comedy films
2020s Spanish-language films
2020s Peruvian films
Peruvian comedy films
La Soga Producciones films
Films set in Peru
Films shot in Peru
Films about friendship
Films about death
Films about families
Films about divorce